George Joseph Kirby (born February 4, 1998) is an American professional baseball pitcher for the Seattle Mariners of Major League Baseball (MLB).

Amateur career
Kirby grew up a fan of the New York Yankees in Westchester County, New York and attended Rye High School in Rye, where he played both baseball and basketball. As a sophomore baseball player in 2014, he threw 153 pitches in the NYSPHSAA Section 1 Class A championship game to beat Lakeland High School. Elon University began recruiting him to play college baseball in 2014. After his junior season in 2015, he was named to the New York State Sportswriters Association's All-State First Team for Class A as a pitcher and first baseman and The Journal News Westchester/Putnam All-Star First Team alongside Josiah Gray. As a senior in 2016, he went 6–0 with a 0.32 ERA and 73 strikeouts in  innings and was again named to the All-State First Team. Although expected to be an early pick in the 2016 Major League Baseball draft, he fell to the New York Mets in the 32nd round because of signability concerns. He chose not to sign with the Mets and instead chose to attend Elon to play college baseball for the Elon Phoenix.

As a freshman at Elon in 2017, Kirby appeared in 16 games (five starts) and pitched to a 1–3 record with a 4.84 ERA, striking out 55 batters in  innings. He was named to the Colonial Athletic Association (CAA) All-Rookie Team. In 2018, as a sophomore, Kirby appeared and started in 15 games, going 10–3 with a 2.89 ERA and 96 strikeouts in  innings. He earned a spot on the All-CAA Second Team. After the season, Kirby played in the Cape Cod Baseball League for the Harwich Mariners where he posted a 1.38 ERA in 13 innings. Prior to the 2019 season, Kirby was named a preseason All-American by both Baseball America and Perfect Game. He was named the 2019 CAA Pitcher of the Year after going 8–2 with a 2.75 ERA in 14 starts, striking out 107 batters and walking only six in  innings.

Professional career
Considered to be one of the top prospects for the 2019 Major League Baseball draft, Kirby was drafted by the Seattle Mariners with the 20th overall pick. He signed with Seattle for $3.24 million. After signing, he was assigned to the Everett AquaSox of the Class A Short Season Northwest League, with whom he spent all of the 2019 season. Over nine games (eight starts), Kirby compiled a 2.35 ERA, striking out 25 over 23 innings. Kirby did not play a minor league game in 2020 due to the cancellation of the minor league season caused by the COVID-19 pandemic. To begin 2021, he returned to Everett, now members of the High-A West. In August, he was promoted to the Arkansas Travelers of the Double-A Central. Over 15 starts between the two clubs, Kirby compiled a 5–3 record and 2.53 ERA, striking out eighty batters over  innings. Kirby returned to Arkansas to open the 2022 season.

On May 8, 2022, the Mariners selected Kirby's contract and promoted him to the major leagues. He made his MLB debut that day as the starting pitcher versus the Tampa Bay Rays, and threw six scoreless innings in which he struck out seven batters.

On August 24, 2022, while pitching against the Washington Nationals, Kirby set an MLB record by throwing 24 consecutive strikes to start the game, the most by a major league pitcher since 1988. The previous record was set by Joe Musgrove in 2018 with 21 consecutive strikes.

References

External links

1998 births
Living people
People from Rye, New York
Baseball players from New York (state)
Major League Baseball pitchers
Seattle Mariners players
Elon Phoenix baseball players
Harwich Mariners players
Everett AquaSox players
Arkansas Travelers players
Tacoma Rainiers players